Narwana is a town and a municipal council in Jind district in the Indian state of Haryana.

History and etymology

Narwana is shortcode as NRW in Indian Railways and according to historical references and the ancestors, there are several myths related to the existence of the city's name. One of them is that it was named after a lake, Nirwana, near Baba Gaibi Sahib Temple. And another one is that people with the Jat surname Mor lived in Narwana with a large number of the population before and it was called Morwana before and later was changed to Narwana. Before the partition in 1947, 25% of Narwana's population were Muslims, mainly Arains, Lohars, Rajputs and Julahas, who all migrated to Pakistan and settled in the environs of Bahawalnagar and Minchinabad.

Geography

It has an average elevation of 213 metres (702 feet).

Climate

Narwana features a typical version of the humid subtropical climate. Summers are long and extremely hot, from early April to mid-October, with the monsoon season in between. The months of March to May see a time of hot prickling heat. Monsoon arrives at the end of June, bringing some respite from the heat, but increasing humidity at the same time. The brief, mild winter starts in late November and peaks in January and is notorious for its heavy fog. Extreme temperatures range from −0.6 °C (30.9 °F) to 46.7 °C (116.1 °F).

Religions and Communities 

Hindus constitute the bulk of the population mainly of Jats.

Education

There are number of schools in the city affiliated either to State board or Central board. Also there are many schools affiliated to CBSE.

Colleges in The City

 K.M.Govt.College Narwana
 Govt. Polytechnic narwana
 Industrial Training Institute (ITI)
 Rajiv gandhi college 
 S.D. Kanya Manavidyalaya Narwana

Demographics and well-known persons

 India census, Narwana had a population of 62090. Males constitute 38,073 of the population and females 34,017. Narwana has an average literacy rate of 77.22%, higher than the national average of 74.04%. Hindu Jats are in majority and surnames such as Goyat, Mor, nain and Dhillon are found here.

Manjeet Chahal got 1st rank in 800m in the Asian games.

Utility services

The water supply in Narwana is managed by its Jal Board and is well managed . Narwana's Electric Supply Undertaking is managed by the DHBVN.BSNL provides tele-services for landline and mobile and many other services. Many private telecom operators are also offering their services in the city as Jio, Vodafone Essar, Airtel, Idea, Reliance, Tata.

Utility services are well managed including water supplies, irrigation and agriculture, banking. Medical services are served by a Civil Hospital and private hospitals.

Transportation

Narwana is well connected with railway and road network as it many cities jind, Tohana. jakhal, bathinda, patiala, ludhiana, Kaithal, Pundri, ambala, chandigarh, safidon, panipat, rohtak, delhi, gurugram and faridabad. It is connected with NH 52, NH152 and NH 352. Haryana Roadways buses connect it with most of the destinations. Buses are available in day hours and also in night hours but in rare numbers.

Healthcare

There is a 100-bed civil hospital in the town and many other private hospitals that provides healthcare facilities to the residents of the town And There are many medicals shops that provide medicine and some of themBhagwati Medical Hall famous for providing a big range of medicine.

Places of interest

There are some places of interest to visit in Narwana. Nehru Park is one of them. Stadium For Games (Nav-deep stadium has India's first indoor Handball court, which is only in Narwana and also a newly made athletic track of world-class standards, as well as FIH approved hockey astroturf) and Chotu Ram Park are well known.

Religious places

Baba Gaibi Sabh is a very old and religious temple in this City. People from nearby villages come to pray here esp on Sunday. Apart from this there are some other famous temples like Bhagwan Prashuram Mandir, Hanuman Mandir, Navgarah Mandir near Bakshi cinema, Vishavkarma temple, Old Shiv temple near dhola kuan etc. It is said that the main idol of Hanuman Mandir is made by the five pandavas.

Airport links

Nearest Airports to Narwana are of Hisar, Chandigarh, Patiala and Delhi. Delhi's Airport is very well connected to the Narwana Palace and Indian states and territories. A few private companies also provide charted flights from Sirsa, which is 2 hours distance by road.

Internet Services 

There are plenty of options available for data connectivity in Narwana city. Apart from 3G and 4G services there are pretty good broadband services offered by BSNL, Digital World Broadband etc.

Railway Connectivity

By rail it is on the main BG line that connects the national capital to Bhatinda.
It is also a junction station with branch line to Kurukshetra. The important trains which stop at this station are
(1).12137/38 CSMT(Mumbai)–Firozpur Cantt Punjab Mail S/F Express

(2).11449/50 Jabalpur-Shri mata  vaishno Devi Katra Durgawati Express

(3).12481/82 Sriganga Nagar–Delhi Intercity Express,

(4).19023/24 Mumbai–Firozpur cantt Janta Express (Via Kota),

(5).13007/08 Howrah–Sriganga Nagar(Via Patna) Udhyan Abha Tufan Express,

(6).16317/18 Kanyakumari–Shri mata vaishno devi katra Himsagar Express (1 of Longest train running in India),

(7).16687/88 Mangalore centreal–Shri mata vaishno devi katra Navyug Express,

(8).16031/32 Chenni centreal–Shri mata vaishno devi katra Andman Express,

(9).14035/36 Pathankot–Delhi Sarai Rohilla Dhauladhar Express,

(10).15909/10 Dibrugarh–Lalgarh (Bikaner) Avadh Assam Express
  
(11).14623/24 Chindwada-Firozpur cantt Patalkot Express,

(12).22479/80 New Delhi-Lohian khas Sarbat Da Bhala express,

(13).22485/86 New Delhi-Moga Intercity express

(14).12421/22 Amritsar-Nanded weakly express

(15).16787/88 Tirunelveli-Shri mata vashino devi katra Weakly Express,

(16).19803/04 Kota-shri mata vaishno devi katra weakly Express,

(17).19717/18 Sabarmati-Daulatpur chowk Sabarmati Express

(18).20409/10 Delhi-Bhatinda super fast express A newly Introduced train

(19)09711/12 Jaipur-Narwana shri khatu shyam Express

(20).74013/14 Kurukshetra-Delhi DMU Via Narwana Proposed an express train according to Indian railway 
and a few other passenger trains.

Many express train Passing from Narwana jn and provide a faster connectivity to Dist. HQ JIND which is appx.35 km From Narwana and Jakhaljn which is Appx.40 km form Narwana.
Following Express:-
(1)12455/56 Bikaner-Delhi sarai Rohilla AC express

(2)12485/86 Sriganganagar-Nanded via Abhore Express

(3).12439/40 Sriganganagar-Nanded via Hunumangarh express

(4).22941/42 Indore-Udhampur Express

(5).20985/86 Kota-Udhampur Express

(6).22895/96 Durg-firozpur cantt Antoyda Express

(7).12047/48 New Delhi-Firozpur cantt Shatabdi Express 
By Indian railway parposed to conversion of Shatabdi express into Janshatabdi Express/Superfast Express in ZBTT-2020.

Sports

Football, Kabaddi, Handball, Badminton and Cricket are the most popular sports in Narwana.
Narwana's NavDeep stadium was named in honor of players Naveen and Deepak, who died in a train accident while returning from a sport meet. It has a football playground, hockey playground, wrestling court, tennis court and badminton hall, gymnastics, roping and much more and has a capacity of about 15,000 people.

References

Cities and towns in Jind district